Flatau is a surname of people mostly of Polish and German origin. Notable people with the surname include:
Dorota Flatau, (1874-1947) Australian born author resident in Britain
Edward Flatau, (1868-1932) Polish neurologist
Joanna Flatau (1928–1999), Polish female psychiatrist
Kazimierz Flatau (1910–2000), Polish harpsichordist, music critic, physicist and translator
Theodor Simon Flatau (1860–1937), Prussian-German physician
Victor Flatau (1989-) Swedish professional golfplayer

See also 
Flatow

Polish-language surnames